Music Keeps Me Together is the eighth studio album by American blues artist Taj Mahal. The album was remixed at Sigma Sound Studios in Philadelphia by Jay Mark and Carl Paruolo.

Track listing
All tracks composed by Taj Mahal; except where indicated
 "Music Keeps Me Together" (Earl Lindo)
 "When I Feel the Sea Beneath My Soul"
 "Dear Ladies"
 "Aristocracy" (poem: Inshirah Mahal; arranged and adapted by Taj Mahal)
 "Further on Down the Road (You Will Accompany Me)" (lyrics: Taj Mahal; music: Taj Mahal, Chuck Blackwell, Jesse Ed Davis, Gary Gilmore)
 "Roll, Turn, Spin" (Joseph Spence; arranged and adapted by Taj Mahal)
 "West Indian Revelation"
 "My Ancestors" (Demetriss Tapp)
 "Brown Eyed Handsome Man" (Chuck Berry)
 "Why?...And We Repeat/Why?...And We Repeat"

Personnel
Taj Mahal - vocals, guitar, banjo, piano, electric piano, mandolin
Hoshal Wright - guitar
Ray Fitzpatrick - bass
Bill Rich - bass on "Why?...And We Repeat Why?...And We Repeat!"
Earl Lindo - keyboards
Kwasi Dzidzornu - congas on "Why?...And We Repeat Why?...And We Repeat!"
Larry McDonald - percussion, congas
Kester Smith - drums
Rudy Costa - saxophone, clarinet
"Sweet" Annie Sampson, Sister Carole Fredericks, Jo Baker - backing vocals
Intergalactic Soul Messengers Band (ISMB) - ensemble

References

1975 albums
Taj Mahal (musician) albums
Columbia Records albums